Tyrosinol is an organic compound with the formula .  A colorless or white solid, it is produced by the reduction of the amino acid tyrosine with borane dimethylsulfide.  The compound, which is chiral, is an example of a 1,2-ethanolamine.

Related compounds
 tyrosol,

References

Primary alcohols
Amines